Jean-Claude Biloa (born 3 August 1949) is a Cameroonian wrestler. He competed in the men's freestyle 90 kg at the 1980 Summer Olympics.

References

External links
 

1949 births
Living people
Cameroonian male sport wrestlers
Olympic wrestlers of Cameroon
Wrestlers at the 1980 Summer Olympics
Place of birth missing (living people)